In mathematics, the max–min inequality is as follows:

For any function 
 

The example function  illustrates that the equality does not hold for every function.

Proof 
Define  For all , we get   for all  by definition of the infimum being a lower bound. Next, for all ,  for all  by definition of the supremum being an upper bound. Because the supremum is the least upper bound,   holds for all . By the greatest lower bound property of infimum, . Putting all the pieces together, we get

 

which proves the desired inequality.

References

See also
 Minimax theorem

Mathematical optimization
Inequalities